Vitaliy Sachko (born 14 July 1997) is a Ukrainian tennis player. He has a career-high singles ranking of World No. 220 achieved on 7 March 2022 and also reached as high as No. 149 in doubles on 2 May 2022. He is currently the No. 2 Ukrainian tennis player.

Professional career

2020: ATP debut
He made his ATP main draw debut at the 2020 Erste Bank Open in the singles draw as lucky loser, where he was defeated by Dominic Thiem, 4–6, 5–7.

2021: Challenger Tour success, Top 250 debut
In March, ranked No. 389 in the world, he made it to the final of the Challenger Tour event in Lugano, Switzerland, where he lost to Dominic Stephan Stricker. In July, he made another Challenger final in Perugia, Italy losing to Tomas Martin Etcheverry in singles. At the same tournament, he took his revenge, winning his third Challenger doubles title for 2021 by defeating the Argentinian pair Tomas Etcheverry/Renzo Olivo, partnering Dominic Stricker. As a result, he reached a career-high ranking of No. 269 in singles and No. 220 in doubles on 12 July 2021.

2022
Ranked No. 265, in July, he qualified for his second ATP singles main draw at the 2022 Generali Open Kitzbühel as a lucky loser where he lost to Dusan Lajovic.

ATP Challenger and ITF Futures finals

Singles: 5 (2–3)

Doubles: 16 (9–7)

Record against top 10 players
Sachko's record against players who have been ranked in the top 10 (as of 27 October 2020):

References

External links

1997 births
Living people
Ukrainian male tennis players
People from Kremenchuk
Sportspeople from Poltava Oblast